Hazelton Air Services Pty Limited, trading as Hazelton Airlines, was an Australian regional airline which operated until 2001. It was established as an independent airline but by the end of its existence had become a subsidiary of Ansett Australia.

History 
Founded in 1953 by Max Hazelton, alongside his brother Jim, with a single Auster Aiglet aircraft offering charter services from a farm near Toogong, New South Wales, the fledgeling organisation was in 1959 relocated to Cudal (near Orange) in NSW. Its scheduled passenger operations began in 1975 with flights between Orange NSW and Canberra ACT. By the 1980s Hazelton operated a sizeable fleet of piston-engined and turboprop aircraft including Cessna 310s, Piper PA-31-350 Chieftains and Embraer EMB 110 Bandeirantes, Shorts 360's as well as Cessna A188 Ag Husky crop sprayers. In the 1990s Hazelton divested itself of its piston-engined passenger aircraft and associated routes in Western NSW to Air Link of Dubbo (an organisation that was still operating many of the same aircraft when purchased by the successor company to Hazelton, Regional Express, in 2006). At the end of its existence the airline operated an all-turboprop fleet of Saab 340 and Fairchild Metro 23 aircraft.

Following the collapse of its parent company in 2001, the airline was acquired by a consortium known as Australiawide Airlines and was merged with fellow Ansett subsidiary Kendell Airlines to create Regional Express.

Destinations 
Towards the end of its operation Hazelton Airlines operated these to these destinations:
Albury-Wodonga
Armidale
Bathurst
Brisbane
Broken Hill
Casino
Cudal
Dubbo
Gold Coast
Griffith
Lismore
Merimbula 
Moruya
Mudgee
Narrandera
Orange
Parkes
Sydney
Traralgon/Morwell
Wagga Wagga

Fleet 
Throughout its existence, Hazelton Airlines operated these aircraft:

 Cessna 310
 Cessna A188
 Piper PA-31-350 Chieftain
 Embraer EMB 110 Bandeirante
 Fairchild Metro 23
 Saab 340
 Shorts 360

See also
List of defunct airlines of Australia
 Aviation in Australia

References

Defunct airlines of Australia
Airlines established in 1953
Airlines disestablished in 2001
Ansett Australia
Former Star Alliance affiliate members
Australian companies established in 1953
Australian companies disestablished in 2001